Peter Jonathan Aykroyd (November 19, 1955 – November 6, 2021) was a Canadian actor, comedian, and writer.

Biography
Born to Lorraine (1918–2018) and Peter Hugh Aykroyd (1922–2020) in Ottawa, he was the younger brother of comedian Dan Aykroyd. Along with his older brother he was in the Second City comedy troupe in Toronto. The two were also on Saturday Night Live. He was a cast member and writer during the show's fifth season, from 1979–1980.

He and Dan Aykroyd wrote the movie Nothing but Trouble in the early 1990s; Peter wrote the story and Dan wrote the screenplay. In 1996, Peter Aykroyd co-created the Canadian sci-fi show Psi Factor with Christopher Chacon and Peter Ventrella; the show was hosted by his brother Dan and produced 88 episodes.

In 1997, Peter Aykroyd and Jim Belushi provided the voices of Elwood Blues and Jake Blues for the cartoon The Blues Brothers: Animated Series, playing the roles made famous by their respective brothers Dan and John. Peter Aykroyd appeared in such films as Spies Like Us, Dragnet, Nothing but Trouble and Coneheads.

Aykroyd died in Spokane, Washington on November 6, 2021, at age 65, two weeks before his 66th birthday, from sepsis caused by an untreated abdominal hernia. His death was first announced two weeks later, through a title card on Saturday Night Live.

Filmography

Film

Television

References

External links

 

1955 births
2021 deaths
20th-century Canadian comedians
21st-century Canadian comedians
Canadian male comedians
Canadian male film actors
Canadian male screenwriters
Canadian male voice actors
Canadian people of Dutch descent
Canadian people of English descent
Canadian people of French descent
Canadian people of Irish descent
Canadian people of Scottish descent
Canadian sketch comedians
Comedians from Ontario
Deaths from hernias
Deaths from sepsis
Infectious disease deaths in Washington (state)
Male actors from Ottawa
Writers from Ottawa